Elizabeth Dundas (1650  25 May 1731), Lady Stair, was a Scottish noblewoman and owner of Lady Stair’s House in the Lawnmarket, in Edinburgh’s Old Town.

Early life 
Elizabeth was born in 1650, the daughter of Sir John Dundas of Newliston and his wife Agnes Gray. She was the granddaughter of Sir William Gray of Pittendrum, and his wife Egidia or Geida Smith.

She had one brother, John Dundas, who was born in 1639.

Marriage and later life 
In 1655 Elizabeth inherited the bankrupt estates of her father.

In 1667 she was forcibly abducted, however, although this was investigated, no conviction was made.

Around 1668/9 she married John Dalrymple, the First Earl of Stair (1648-1707).  Between 1670-1680 she had 6 sons and 4 daughters, although only 3 sons and one daughter survived childhood.

She died on 25 May 1731, aged 81.

Lady Stair’s House 
Elizabeth’s grandparents, Sir William Gray and Egidia Smith built the house now known as Lady Stair’s House in 1622.  

By 1719 Elizabeth was a widow, and she bought her grandparents’ house, known then as Lady Gray’s House after her grandmother.  It was originally left to her mother’s younger sister.  She lived here until her death in 1731

In 1765 the house was sold by her grandson, John Dalrymple of Newliston, who became 5th Earl of Stair in 1768.

References 

1650 births
1731 deaths
Scottish noblewomen